Moh (Punjabi: ਮੋਹ; mōha) is a 2022 Indian Punjabi-language romantic drama film  directed by Jagdeep Sidhu. The film bankrolled by Shri Narotam Ji Productions, Tips Films Ltd. and Orion Studios, stars Sargun Mehta and singer Gitaz Bindrakhia in his acting debut. It depicts a doomed affair of a teenager  with a married woman. Jagdeep sidhu stated that this movie CANNOT be released to any OTT platform but there can be a re release of movie only on fans demand , and was released theatrically on 16 September 2022 by White Hill Studios.

Cast
 Sargun Mehta as Gorey
 Gitaj Bindrakhia as Rabbi
 Amrit Amby as Rana
 Prabh Bains as Gurinder
 Prakash Gadhu as Rabbi's father
 Balraj Sidhu
 Sukhdev Ladhar
 Aman Suthdar
 Ikatar Singh
 Jashanjit Gosha
 Parminder Barnala
 Anita Meet
 Kumar Ajay
 Kulwinder Sidhu
 Vikram Pannu
 Fateh Siyan

Production
Director Jagdeep Sidhu launched the film on 24 September 2021 after the success of his earlier film Qismat 2 and announced the tentative release date as 23 September 2022.
Principal photography began on 9 February 2022.
Moh marks as the first film of Gitaj Bindrakhia.

Soundtrack

Soundtrack of Moh  is composed by B Praak, lyrics by Jaani and the songs are sung by B Praak. First track "Sub Kuchh" was released on 22 August 2022 by Tips Punjabi.

Track list

Reception
Kiddaan.com gave the film 4 stars out of 5, praising performances, direction and dialogues. They criticised the slow screenplay but appreciated the climax. Concluding they stated, "Moh is a surreal and satisfying experience for everyone who craves to watch genuine and pure emotions on silver screens." They further wrote, "Moh a typical Jagdeep Sidhu film, has a beautiful story, elegant dialogues and some brilliant performances." Neha Vashist of the Times of India rated the film 4 stars out of 5 and wrote, "it is a kind of film which is high on the emotional quotient and has been presented in a way that even the tragedy is painted in different hues of beauty and intensity." Vashist praising the performances wrote, "it appears to be Sargun’s best performance so far", and writing about Gitaz Bindrakhia's debut she stated, "well it appears that there could have been no better project for his entry into Pollywood." Vashist appreciated the music and climax of the film and concluded, "Moh is a pure treat made with good content and emotions." Sheetal of The Tribune wrote, "In one sentence, Punjabi film Moh is pure poetry! And the director, Jagdeep Sidhu, has lived up to his reputation."

References

External links

2022 films
Indian romantic drama films
Films scored by B Praak
Punjabi-language Indian films
2022 romantic drama films
Films directed by Jagdeep Sidhu